José Carlos Malato (born 7 March 1964, in Monforte) is a Portuguese TV presenter, radio broadcaster, copywriter and college teacher. In 2018, he publicly declared himself as gay. In 2022, he declared himself as non-binary.

Television programs hosted
 Top+, on RTP1 with Ana Lamy.
 Portugal no Coração, on RTP1, with Merche Romero, Marta Leite de Castro and Cristina Alves.
 Um Contra Todos, on RTP1.
 A Herança, on RTP1.
 Sexta À Noite, on RTP1.
 Jogo Duplo, on RTP1.
 Decisão Final, on RTP1.

References

External links
José Carlos Malato's Facebook

Portuguese television presenters
Living people
1964 births
People from Monforte, Portugal
Portuguese LGBT entertainers
Portuguese non-binary people
Non-binary entertainers
Portuguese LGBT broadcasters
21st-century Portuguese LGBT people